The Norman Thompson N.T.4 was a twin-engined British flying boat of the First World War.  Although less well known than similar Curtiss and Felixstowe flying boats, 50 were ordered for Britain's Royal Naval Air Service.

Development and design
The White and Thompson company was formed by Norman Thompson and Douglas White in 1912 at Bognor Regis, Sussex to design and build aircraft. It built several models of aircraft in small numbers, before being renamed the Norman Thompson Flight Company in September 1915.

The first aircraft to be produced by the renamed company was a twin-engined patrol flying boat, the Norman Thompson N.T.4.  This was a three bay biplane powered by two pusher Hispano-Suiza engines mounted between the wings and was fitted with an enclosed, heavily glazed cockpit for its four-man crew.

An initial order for ten aircraft for the Royal Naval Air Service was placed in December 1915, with the first prototype flying in October 1916. Further orders were placed in 1917 bringing the total ordered to 50. Production continued through 1917, but in 1918, following a change in policy on anti-submarine aircraft, the final contract for 20 aircraft was cancelled. Total production was 26 aircraft, continuing until June 1918.

Norman Thompson produced a revised design to meet the requirements of Admiralty Specification N.2C, to replace the N.T.4.  This type, designated the Norman Thompson N.2C used the wings of the N.T.4 but with a new hull resembling that of the Porte/Felixstowe boats. Power was by two 200 hp (149 kW) Sunbeam Arab engines.  The first prototype attempted to fly on 1 August 1918, but required changes to the hull before it was capable of take-off.  Water handling remained poor, and the aircraft was tail heavy in flight. It was abandoned following the end of the war.

Operational history
The N.T.4 entered service with the RNAS in 1916, being operated on anti-submarine patrols over the North Sea and English Channel but were mainly used for training, as larger aircraft were more suitable for patrol purposes. Many of the aircraft produced in 1918 were delivered straight to storage and were never used. Owing to its similarity in size to the Curtiss H-4, it shared the Curtiss flying boat's nickname of America, being renamed Small America when the larger Curtiss H-12 (known as Large America) and Felixstowe F.2 flying boats came into service.

Variants
N.T.4
Initial batch of six aircraft.  Powered by two 150 hp Hispano-Suiza engines.
N.T.4A
Main production type. Powered by 200 hp geared Hispano-Suiza engines.  44 built.
N2C
Improved version with hull similar to Felixstowe flying boats, powered by two Sunbeam Arab engines.  Two prototypes only built in 1918.

Operators

Royal Naval Air Service

Specifications (N.T.4A)

See also

Notes

References

External links
 Norman Thompson N.T.4: British Aircraft Directory

1910s British patrol aircraft
Flying boats
Twin-engined pusher aircraft
N.T.4
Biplanes
Aircraft first flown in 1916